Moullava spicata is an endemic species of creeper found in the Western Ghats of India.

Description
As follows:
 It is a robust woody climber, having recurved prickles on its branches. 
 Leaves - compound, bipinnate, 23–30 cm long with 4 to 6 pairs of pinnae, each 7.5 to 12 cm long, and having 5 to 7 pairs of oblong, coriaceous and dark-green leaflets on each pinna. The main rachis is armed with prickles.
 Flowers - sessile in dense spicate racemes reaching 60 cm long; the rachis is grooved with soft hairs, armed with prickles. 
 Corolla - has 5 petals, inserted on top of the calyx-tube, obovate-spathulate, dark orange. 1 cm long, doesn't open fully.
 Calyx : scarlet, 
 Androecium : has 10 stamens.
 Fruit - a linear oblong pod, swollen above the seeds and constricted between them. 
 Seeds - 3 to 4, oblong, hard, bony.

Natural history
Moullava spicata is a creeper endemic to the moist deciduous and semievergreen forests of the Western Ghats. The creeper flowers and fruits from October to May. The flowers are frequented by birds and insects.

Uses
The seed of M. spicata yields an oil used for burning in lamps.

Local names
Local names in the different ranges of the Western Ghats are:
 English: Candy Corn plant
 Marathi: Wagati वागाटी, Wakeri वाकेरी 
 Tamil: Okkadikkodi, Pulinakkagondai 
 Kannada: ಗಜ್ಜಿಗಾಬಲ್ಲೀ Gajjigaballi

References

External links

Caesalpinieae
Plants described in 1851
Taxa named by Nicol Alexander Dalzell